Chancay District is one of twelve districts of the province Huaral in Peru.

History
In the pre-Columbian Chancay culture ruled over the valleys of Chancay and Huaura. The mummies found from the Ancon and Zepita necropolis have evidence that this culture expanded far north up to the Chillón valley. The Chancay culture took place between 1300 and 1450 A.D and after that became part of the Inca empire.

Chancay was founded by Luis Flores, according to the viceroy Diego López de Zúñiga, 4th Count of Nieva, on November 16, 1562. By then its name was Villa de Arnedo in memory of the fee he had in Spain.

Although it was a "Spanish town", according to the 1792 census, the town had a total of 2960 people but only 369 were Spanish. Most of them were slaves and Indians.

By the time of Peru's independence, the April 16, 1828 law was created by the people of Chancay, and that made the town a "faithful town"

In 1966, a 6.2 magnitude earthquake caused great damage in the north of Chancay and part of the Lima-Callao area. 30 people died in Chancay and 4,000 homes were destroyed, in the Lima-Callao area 100 people died because of the tsunami and  homes collapsed there, trapping the people inside them.

Capital
Its capital, the city of Chancay, is 83 km north of the city of Lima. The altitude of the city is 43 m.a.s.l.

Administrative division

Populated areas
 Urban
 Chancay, with 32,312 people
 Peralvillo, with 15,634 people
 Buena Vista, with 988 people
 Chancayllo, with 2,199 people
 Cerro La Culebra, with 920 people
 Nueva Estrella, with 701 people
 Pampa Libre, with 5,776 people
 Quepe Pampa, with 1,252 people
 28 de Julio, with 714 people
 Rural
 Buena Vista Baja, with 294 people
 El Hatillo, with 382 people
 Ex Hacienda Chancayllo, with 279 people
 La Calera, with 157 people
 Las Salinas, with 204 people
 Los Laureles, with 160 people
 Los Laureles del Norte, with 157 people
 Los Laureles Sur, with 544 people
 Pampa El Inca, with 237 people
 Quepepampa, with 365 people
 San Cayetano, with 359 people
 Torre Blanca, with 384 people
 4 de Junio, with 596 people

Festivals
 March–April: Holy Week
 June: Simon Peter
 December: Anniversary of Chancay

See also
 Huaral Province
 Lima Region

External links
  INEI Perú
  Huaralenlinea Perú

References